Larry Attard (born December 31, 1951 in Malta) is a retired Hall of Fame Champion jockey and current horse trainer in Canadian Thoroughbred horse racing.

Born into a Maltese family who emigrated to Canada, Attard has three older brothers who became Thoroughbred trainers. In 1973 Larry Attard began riding and although hampered by many injuries, his career lasted twenty-five years. He rode at Ontario's Greenwood, Fort Erie and Woodbine Racetracks. He won three riding titles at Woodbine and was the leading jockey in Ontario three times. Twice voted the Sovereign Award for Outstanding Jockey, among his numerous stakes race wins, in 1983 Larry Attard won Canada's most prestigious race, the Queen's Plate.

For his contribution to Thoroughbred horse racing, in 1993 Larry Attard was voted the Avelino Gomez Memorial Award. He retired after another injury-filled year in 1997 and in 2001 was inducted into the Mississauga, Ontario Sports Hall of Fame and the Canadian Horse Racing Hall of Fame.

References
 Larry Attard at the Canadian Horse Racing Hall of Fame

1951 births
Living people
Avelino Gomez Memorial Award winners
Canadian Horse Racing Hall of Fame inductees
Canadian jockeys
Canadian people of Maltese descent
Maltese emigrants to Canada
Naturalized citizens of Canada